The director-general of the World Health Organization (WHO) is the chief executive officer of the World Health Organization and the principal advisor to the United Nations on matters pertaining global health. The director general is elected  by and answers to the World Health Assembly (WHA). The current director-general is Tedros Adhanom Ghebreyesus, who was appointed on 1 July 2017, and re-appointed on 24 May 2022. The Director-General also leads the WHO Secretariat and is also the ex-officio Secretary of the World Health Assembly, the WHO Executive Board, and of all commissions and committees, and conferences convened by the Organization.

Selection process
Candidates for Director-General can be proposed by Member States, then nominated by the Executive Board and appointed by the World Health Assembly.

The appointment process begins more than one year prior to the May vote, when the WHO sends out a letter informing Member States that the nomination process has begun. The nomination period ends in mid-September, and candidates are announced at the end of October. If there are multiple candidates, the executive board of the WHO — a panel of members from 34 member countries representing the various WHO regions — interviews the nominees.

The term of the Director-General lasts for five years. Office holders can be and have been appointed for multiple subsequent terms, such as Marcolino Gomes Candau who served for four consecutive terms. The Director-General is typically appointed in May, when the WHA meets.

List of Directors-General of the WHO

References

World Health Organization
Public health